"Who Knows Where the Time Goes?" is a song written by English folk singer Sandy Denny in 1967.

This title can also refer to:
Who Knows Where the Time Goes (Judy Collins album), a 1968 album by Judy Collins
Who Knows Where the Time Goes? (Sandy Denny album), a 1985 compilation by Sandy Denny
Who Knows Where the Time Goes? (Fairport Convention album), a 1997 album by Fairport Convention
Who Knows Where the Time Goes, a 2011 album by Rondi Charleston